The 1989 UK & Ireland Greyhound Racing Year was the 63rd year of greyhound racing in the United Kingdom and Ireland.

Roll of honour

Summary
The National Greyhound Racing Club (NGRC) released the annual returns, with totalisator turnover at £106,011,494 and attendances recorded at 4,395,973 from 5477 meetings. 

John McGee won the Greyhound Trainer of the Year for the second successive year. Waltham Abbey now trained by Ernie Gaskin (formerly Adam Jackson) was voted Greyhound of the Year after winning the Grand Prix at Walthamstow Stadium. The award failed to go the winners of a Derby due to the fact that all three were won by the Irish; they were the 1989 English Greyhound Derby (Lartigue Note), the 1989 Scottish Greyhound Derby (Airmount Grand) and the 1989 Irish Greyhound Derby (Manorville Magic), the latter was voted Irish Greyhound of the Year.

Tracks
The Greyhound Racing Association (GRA} invested £1 million into Hall Green, mainly extending the restaurant. The Peterborough management also unveiled their new raceview restaurant costing £500,000. Terry Corden sold the Sheffield lease; he was forced to do so after the council closed the stadium due to new safety measures. This was as a direct result of the Hillsborough disaster.

Hull (New Craven Park) and Hawick both opened for racing.

Competitions
The Scottish Derby returned to Glasgow (as a consequence of GRA having no stadia in Scotland), the event received a boost when Ladbrokes stepped in and sponsored the competition. Racing Manager Robert Lithgow was forced to increase the entries from 24 to 36 due to its popularity. The event resulted in what many regarded the best ever when Airmount Grand caught Galtymore Lad on the finish line after both vied for the lead throughout. 

Trainer Phil Rees Jr. won the Grand National at Hall Green with Lemon Chip, this was the kennels first Grand National success despite previously winning six Springbok titles. Fearless Ace made a remarkable comeback when winning the Pall Mall Stakes for a second successive year; the fawn dog had won the 1988 final for Geoff De Mulder before being retired to stud. He returned a year later to defend his title under the training of Theo Mentzis after coming out of retirement and not only stormed to a surprise victory but broke the Oxford track record in the final.

News
Brent Walker owners of Hackney took over William Hill and Mecca Bookmakers from Grand Metropolitan for £685 million. Canterbury obtained a Bookmakers Afternoon Greyhound Service (BAGS) contract and Wisbech began the year under NGRC rules. 

Veteran trainer Hugo Spencer retired and John Coleman moved to Walthamstow. Walthamstow also produced one race meeting tote turnover of £173,000 on the night of the Pepsi Cola Marathon final. 

Trainer Linda Jones and her husband Doug moved to Lakenheath and formed the Imperial Kennels. They started with four racing greyhounds and a couple of litters of pups set in the Suffolk countryside. The kennel would quickly establish themselves on the local tracks of Swaffham, Mildenhall and Yarmouth.

Owner John Dooley visited a stud kennel in Cork to find it abandoned and his Blue Riband champion Lulus Hero missing, the brindle dog is never found. #

Champion trainer John McGee and owner Fred Smith had an argument that resulted in Derby champion Hit The Lid leaving the kennels.

Principal UK races

+Track Record

Totalisator returns

The totalisator returns declared to the National Greyhound Racing Club for the year 1989 are listed below.

References 

Greyhound racing in the United Kingdom
Greyhound racing in the Republic of Ireland
UK and Ireland Greyhound Racing Year
UK and Ireland Greyhound Racing Year
UK and Ireland Greyhound Racing Year
UK and Ireland Greyhound Racing Year